Sir Thomas Boverton Redwood FRSE FIC FCS FGS FRSA MIME (1846–1919) was a 19th-century British chemical engineer remembered as a pioneer of the petroleum industry. An early car-collector and enthusiast, he was also one of the first to investigate alcohol as a fuel.

He sat on (and often chaired) multiple government committees, including the British Science Guild, the Home Office Committee on Acetylene Generators. He was chairman of the Gas Traction Committee.  He was vice president of the Society of Chemical Industries. He was president of the Institute of Petroleum Technologists 1914 to 1916. He was vice president of the Illuminating Engineering Society.

Life

He was born in London on 26 April 1846, the eldest of eight children to Prof Theophilus Redwood (1806-1892), originally from Boverton in South Wales, and his wife, Charlotte Elizabeth Morson, daughter of T M R Morson who owned a London pharmaceutical firm. He studied chemistry at University College, London gaining a doctorate (DSc with Honours).

In 1889 he was elected a Fellow of the Royal Society of Edinburgh. His proposers were Sir James Dewar, William Dittmar, Alexander Crum Brown and Robert Rattray Tatlock.

In 1895 he was co-founder of the Self-Propelled Traffic Association and in 1897 he was a co-founder of the Royal Automobile Club (RAC).

In 1912 he was appointed to the Royal Commission on Fuel and Engines. In the First World War he served on several committees ranging from petrol supplies, and oil supplies to the navy to the use of "liquid fire" (napalm) for trench warfare.

In later life he lived at 119 Piccadilly in central London. He was knighted by King Edward VII in 1905 and further was created Baronet of Marylebone Road by King George V in 1911.

He died in London following a short illness on 4 June 1919.

Cars
His first car was a French  then he acquired a Daimler in 1897. The Daimler was custom-built in Coventry to his own specification, being more powerful than average. He also had a De Dion-Bouton Voiturette.

In 1904 he was proud owner of a 7 hp Panhard and 16 hp De Dietrich-Bugatti and his hobby was listed as steam-yachting.

Publications

Cantor Lectures on Petroleum and its Products (1886)
Petroleum: Its Production and Use (1887)
Petroleum: a Treatise on its Geograohical Distribution (1896)
A Treatise on Petroleum (2 vols) (1896)
The Petroleum Technologist's Pocket Book (1915)

Family
In 1873 he married Mary Elizabeth Letchford.

He was father to Bernard Boverton Redwood.

See also

Redwood baronets

References

Further reading

External links
 

1846 births
1919 deaths
Baronets in the Baronetage of the United Kingdom
British chemical engineers
Fellows of the Chemical Society
Fellows of the Geological Society of London
Fellows of the Royal Society of Edinburgh
History of the petroleum industry in the United Kingdom
Engineers from London